Jean-Claude Mignon (born February 2, 1950) was a member of the National Assembly of France.  He represents the Seine-et-Marne department,  and is a member of the Union for a Popular Movement.

On 23 January 2012, he was elected President of the Parliamentary Assembly of the Council of Europe.

References

1950 births
Living people
Parliamentary Assembly of the Council of Europe
Union for a Popular Movement politicians
Deputies of the 12th National Assembly of the French Fifth Republic
Deputies of the 13th National Assembly of the French Fifth Republic
Deputies of the 14th National Assembly of the French Fifth Republic